Parastoo Anoushahpour is an Iranian-Canadian moving image artist based in Toronto. She works primarily with video, film and installation. Anoushahpour’s artistic practice is “research driven, workshop oriented, and collaborative at its core, often involving individuals who organize around specific projects to pool resources, exchange insights, gather knowledge, and investigate collectively”. Anoushahpour has worked as part of an artist collective since 2013 with Faraz Anoushahpour and Ryan Ferko. Their collective practice “explores the interplay of multiple subjectivities as a strategy to address the power inherent in narrative structures”, with a focus on challenging “the production of images through speculative narration and dialectical imagery”.

Anoushahpour’s artist residencies include the Mohammad and Mahera Abu Ghazaleh Foundation in Jordan, Tabakalera International Centre for Contemporary Culture in Spain, Taipei Artist Village in Taiwan, ZK/U Center for Art and Urbanistics in Germany and the Banff Centre for Arts & Creativity in Canada.

Select works

The Time That Separate Us (2022) 
The Time that Separates Us depicts the story of Lot’s Wife through the contemporary Jordan River Valley.  Drawing on the tale of Sodom and Gomorrah, Anoushahpour examines “sexuality, deviance, and queerness in dominant narratives of punishment and superstition while retelling stories of movement, exile, and belonging”. Anoushahpour's film considers how identity and narrative authority shape the modern border conflicts along the Jordan River Valley.

Charity (2021) 
Created by the artist collective of Parastoo Anoushahpour, Faraz Anoushahpour and Ryan Ferko, Charity is an interactive documentary that examines a controversy surrounding public art in Markham, Ontario. The film raises questions about the bureaucratic processes involved in this controversy, the “identity of place” and the “representation of subjective experiences and histories simultaneously”. Charity uses 360° video and photogrammetry to re-tell the community’s “confrontation with a piece of public art”.

The Lighthouse (2014) 
In Anoushahpour’s piece The Lighthouse, two photographs are reproduced as slides and converted into a three-dimensional installation, using a rotating screen and two slide projectors. Depicting a path to a 12th century lighthouse in Dover, UK, the images “mark a history and memory caught within the repetition of the image in the slide carousel and the rotation of the fan”. Both the content and production are described as “liminal”, as the The Lighthouse functions “somewhere between analogue photography and cinema”, showcasing an “ephemeral horizon instead of the promise of arrival and solid land”.

Select Awards 
A select list of awards and grants that Parastoo Anoushahpour has been the recipient of:

 Ontario Arts Council (2019).
 Honorary Mention, Chooka, Media City Film Festival (2018).
 Chalmers Arts Fellowship (2018).
 Emerging Media Artist Grant, Toronto Arts Council (2018).

References 

Iranian artists
21st-century Iranian women artists
Canadian video artists
21st-century Canadian women artists
Canadian installation artists
1986 births
Living people